Néstor Hipólito Giovannini (born February 7, 1961) is an Argentine former professional boxer. He held the WBO cruiserweight title from 1993 through 1994 and also contested for the WBC light-heavyweight title.

Professional career

Early career 
Giovannini made his professional boxing debut at the age of 23 in 1984 losing in a decision. He conquered the Argentinean light-heavyweight title in his 17th fight and continued campaigning at the light-heavyweight division until 1990. That year, he lost by TKO against Jeff Harding for the WBC light-heavyweight world title.

He then moved up to fight at cruiserweight where he got the chance to fight Markus Bott for the WBO cruiserweight world title, which he won by split decision in Hamburg, Germany. He would defend the title once, in a rematch with Bott by unanimous decision. In December 1994, he fought against Dariusz Michalczewski, losing by KO in the 10th round and dropping his WBO title. He would continue fighting scarcely until 2000 without much success.

Professional boxing record

See also
List of cruiserweight boxing champions

External links

|-

1961 births
Living people
Light-heavyweight boxers
Cruiserweight boxers
World cruiserweight boxing champions
World Boxing Organization champions
People from Rafaela
Argentine male boxers
Sportspeople from Santa Fe Province